Vittorio Avanzi (February 21, 1850 – August 7, 1913) was an Italian painter, mainly of landscapes.

Born in Verona, he studied at the Academy in Munich, Bavaria. He exhibited at the exhibition of Venice in 1887, 1897, and 1899. He died in Campofontana. Among his paintings are:
Prima della pioggia 
Le vicinanze di Dachau (village of Bavaria) 
Nelle vicinanze dell' Isaar
La marina di Capri 
Le prime foglie

References

1850 births
1913 deaths
19th-century Italian painters
Italian male painters
20th-century Italian painters
Painters from Verona
Italian landscape painters
19th-century Italian male artists
20th-century Italian male artists